Ramon Pena can refer to:

 Ramon Peña (born 1953), Cuban Olympic water polo player
 Ramón Peña (born 1962), Dominican Republic baseball player
 Ramón González Peña (1888 – 1952), Asturian socialist